Hillhampton is a hamlet and civil parish (with Great Witley) nestled between Great Witley, Little Witley and Shrawley in the Malvern Hills district of the county of Worcestershire, England. It was anciently a detached hamlet of the parish of Martley.

Hillhampton was in the upper division of Doddingtree Hundred.

References

External links
  Hillhampton web site

Villages in Worcestershire
Civil parishes in Worcestershire
Malvern Hills District